The Chapel of St Leo is a Roman Catholic chapel is located in the village of Żurrieq, Malta. The chapel serves as the official cemetery chapel of Żurrieq. It is the only such chapel dedicated to Pope Leo I in Malta.

History
The chapel was one of the churches visited by inquisitor Pietro Dusina during his apostolic visit to Malta in 1575. It is recorded that Dusina found that the chapel had suffered some structural damage and ordered the rector of the chapel to repair the damages. In 1678 the chapel was restored through initiatives by Reverend Salv Fenech. The painting situated at the side of the chapel, representing the Assumption together with two saints was also restored during this restoration.

References

Roman Catholic chapels in Żurrieq
National Inventory of the Cultural Property of the Maltese Islands